Axford is an unincorporated community in southeastern Saskatchewan and located  east of Khedive, Saskatchewan and north of Saskatchewan Highway 13 and due west of Weyburn, Saskatchewan.

A rural farming area, it is the birthplace of former Governor of the Bank of Canada Gerald Bouey.

See also

 List of communities in Saskatchewan

References

Brokenshell No. 68, Saskatchewan
Unincorporated communities in Saskatchewan
Division No. 2, Saskatchewan